Bizanet (Languedocien: Bisanet) is a commune in the Aude department in southern France. Château de Gaussan is located in the commune.

Population

See also
 Corbières AOC
 Communes of the Aude department

References

Communes of Aude
Aude communes articles needing translation from French Wikipedia